Dreaming Tree (referred to ‘Ggumna(꿈나)’) is a 'Hue' café (휴카페,a youth cultural space) located in Seoul, South Korea operated by the Geumcheon-gu Office. It includes a job simulation center in conjunction with the Jinro Vocational Experience Center. 'Ggumna' focuses on giving teenagers a chance to engage in physical and mind refreshing activities.

Activities 
Some of the activities offered at the Experience center include:

Singing
Dancing
Studying
Lecture Theaters

In the ‘Ggumna’ youths are provided with a platform for cultural development and social interactions. Dance groups, vocal performances, and a study club provide interaction with friends.

The management group consists of students from eighth grade and high school and conducts:

 Operation and management
 Media related activities such as publication of a newsletter and broadcasting
 Developing cultural events, campaign route experience programs, etc.

Recognition 
In 2017 the center hosted about 150 teenagers on a daily basis. The cafe won the grand prize in the residential communication field at the Manifesto Good Case Competition and was selected as one of the best business practices in Seoul.

References

Geumcheon District
Youth organizations based in South Korea